Timothy Schroeder is an American philosopher and Professor of Philosophy at Rice University. He is known for his works on nature of desire.

Books
To Act, forthcoming
In Praise of Desire, with N. Arpaly, Oxford University Press 2014
 Three Faces of Desire, Oxford University Press 2004

References

21st-century American philosophers
Philosophy academics
Living people
Year of birth missing (living people)
Ohio State University faculty
Stanford University alumni
Rice University faculty
University of Lethbridge alumni